Abdoulaye Thiam (born January 1, 1984) is a Senegalese sabre fencer. Thiam represented Senegal at the 2008 Summer Olympics in Beijing, where he competed in the men's individual sabre event, along with his teammate Mamadou Keita. He lost the first preliminary round match to U.S. fencer Jason Rogers, with a score of 10–15.

References

External links
Profile – FIE
NBC Olympics Profile

1984 births
Living people
Senegalese male sabre fencers
Olympic fencers of Senegal
Fencers at the 2008 Summer Olympics